Héctor Magliano (born 30 November 1919, date of death unknown) was a Uruguayan footballer. He played in three matches for the Uruguay national football team from 1940 to 1947. He was also part of Uruguay's squad for the 1941 South American Championship.

References

1919 births
Year of death missing
Uruguayan footballers
Uruguay international footballers
Place of birth missing
Association football forwards
Montevideo Wanderers F.C. players